The Barca d'Alva–La Fuente de San Esteban railway is a closed Iberian gauge line which connected  on the Linha do Douro, in northeastern Portugal, to the Spanish railway network. Passenger and cargo trains ran from Porto to Salamanca from its opening in 1887 until its closure on the Spanish side in 1985, with the Portuguese side also subsequently truncated to Pocinho three years later.

See also 
 History of rail transport in Spain
 History of rail transport in Portugal

References

Railway lines in Spain
Bar
Railway lines opened in 1887
Railway lines closed in 1988